Jeremiah Riggs (born December 12, 1982) is an American professional wrestler, and mixed martial artist who competes in the welterweight and middleweight divisions. A professional MMA competitor since 2007, Riggs has made a name for himself mainly fighting in the Midwest, and his home state of Mississippi. He was a competitor on SpikeTV's The Ultimate Fighter: Team Rampage vs Team Forrest as well as a contestant on WWE Tough Enough.

Early life
Riggs was born and raised in Vicksburg, Mississippi. He is the son of an E-9 who served four years in the Coast Guard followed by 31 years in the National Guard. Riggs attended his local high school, playing baseball and football, lettering in both sports. After graduating high school Riggs went on to enroll into Mississippi Delta Community College where he was on the football team.

Upon graduating from college Riggs signed up with the United States Army and served a tour in Afghanistan with the 1st Ranger Battalion. After leaving the Army in 2005, Riggs worked around Mississippi driving trucks for a living; even owning his own trucking business.

Mixed martial arts
Riggs made his professional debut against Craig Sjoerdsma in New Orleans, Louisiana. Riggs won the fight via submission from strikes in the first round. Riggs then fought Robert Thompson for the Southern Fighting Alliance middleweight title belt. The fight lasted all 5 rounds, and Riggs narrowly lost a decision. During the fight, one of Riggs' front teeth was knocked out. In 2007 Riggs sold his trucking company and moved to San Jose to train MMA with Frank Shamrock. Riggs was set to become part of the San Jose Razorclaws, an International Fight League team coached by Shamrock, but the team was disbanded by the IFL before the season began.

After the IFL dissolved Riggs was invited to be a part of season seven of The Ultimate Fighter. Riggs was paired against Dan Cramer in a preliminary match-up to see who obtained entry into the house. Riggs lost a decision, but earned the respect of UFC President Dana White and Quinton Jackson. After filming on TUF Riggs moved to Granite City, Illinois to train with Matt Hughes at The HIT Squad.

Riggs took a fight against up-and-comer Dom O'Grady, losing the fight via submission late in the last round of the fight. The loss was the start of a four-fight losing streak stretching from 2008 to 2010. During that time he saw defeat from soon-to-be teammate Ken Jackson, and future UFC fighter John Salter. Riggs broke the streak in February 2010 after pulling off an impressive triangle choke submission over Jesse Beale. After suffering his last loss Riggs went on a five fight winning streak; with wins coming inside the Bellator Fighting Championships, and Strikeforce. In 2011, Riggs officially retired from MMA to pursue a career in professional wrestling.

On March 16, 2012, Riggs officially came out of retirement at Bellator 61 in Bossier City, Louisiana to fight Trey Houston in a "Middleweight Tournament Qualifier". In 2015 Riggs walked away from MMA and pursued a career in bull riding, competing on small circuits in the midwest and southeast United States.

Television career
After competing on The Ultimate Fighter Riggs was selected to go on VH1's hit reality show Daisy of Love. In an MMA fight arranged by the show's producers, Riggs defeated VH1 reality personality "12 Pack" which saw 12 Pack suffer a broken nose and sent to the hospital. Riggs finished fifth on the show.

When filming of Daisy of Love ended, Riggs was selected to be a part of another VH1 series I Love Money 3

Professional wrestling career
Riggs began his professional wrestling career training with Dutch Mantel in Murfreesboro, Tennessee.

WWE

Tough Enough
In March 2011, he was announced as one of the fourteen contestants for the return of WWE Tough Enough on the USA Network. Throughout the show, Riggs was complimented on his heart and athleticism. He was nicknamed "MMA" by the trainers because of his mixed martial arts background. Along with Martin, he was one of just two contestants to not get stuck in the bottom three. Riggs finished third on the show, being eliminated in week nine because of his inexperience inside the ring.

Florida Championship Wrestling (2011)
In May 2011, Riggs made his debut for Florida Championship Wrestling, the developmental territory for the WWE. He defeated Peter Orlov in his first match as a part of the Tough Enough finale. However, Riggs was released after being informed that WWE had no interest in signing him following the tryout in FCW after rubbing officials and other wrestlers the wrong way.

Filmography

Mixed martial arts record

|-
| Loss
| align=center| 7–8
| Peter Aspenwal
| Decision (split)
| Bellator 101
| 
| align=center| 3
| align=center| 5:00
| Portland, Oregon, United States
|
|-
| Loss
| align=center| 7–7
| Kelvin Tiller
| Submission (Kimura)
| Bellator 70
| 
| align=center| 3
| align=center| 3:38
| New Orleans, Louisiana, United States
|
|-
| Loss
| align=center| 7–6
| Trey Houston
| Submission (armbar)
| Bellator 61
| 
| align=center| 1
| align=center| 3:30
| Bossier City, Louisiana, United States
| 
|-
| Win
| align=center| 7–5
| Eric James Slocum
| Decision (majority)
| SportFight X: Middle Tennessee Mayhem
| 
| align=center| 3
| align=center| 5:00
| Murfreesboro, Tennessee, United States
| 
|-
| Win
| align=center| 6–5
| James Sharp
| Decision (unanimous)
| Strikeforce Challengers: Wilcox vs. Ribeiro
| 
| align=center| 3
| align=center| 5:00
| Jackson, Mississippi, United States
| 
|-
| Win
| align=center| 5–5
| Mike Fleniken
| Decision (unanimous)
| Bellator 30
| 
| align=center| 3
| align=center| 5:00
| Louisville, Kentucky, United States
| 
|-
| Win
| align=center| 4–5
| Menden McKeehan
| TKO (punches)
| Absolute Cage Fights 12
| 
| align=center| 1
| align=center| 0:17
| Knoxville, Tennessee, United States
| 
|-
| Win
| align=center| 3–5
| George Oiler
| TKO (submission to punches)
| Hardrock MMA 23
| 
| align=center| 1
| align=center| 4:59
| Albany, Kentucky, United States
| 
|-
| Loss
| align=center| 2–5
| Keith Johnson
| Submission (rear-naked choke)
| Empire FC: A Night of Reckoning 3
| 
| align=center| 2
| align=center| 4:34
| Tunica, Mississippi, United States
| 
|-
| Win
| align=center| 2–4
| Jesse Beal
| Submission (triangle choke)
| Empire FC: A Night of Reckoning 2
| 
| align=center| 1
| align=center| 4:48
| Tunica, Mississippi, United States
| 
|-
| Loss
| align=center| 1–4
| Eric Irvin
| Decision (unanimous)
| Devastation Fight Club
| 
| align=center| 3
| align=center| 3:00
| Cape Girardeau, Missouri, United States
| 
|-
| Loss
| align=center| 1–3
| John Salter
| TKO (punches)
| CCCW: The 3rd Degree
| 
| align=center| 1
| align=center| 4:44
| Springfield, Illinois, United States
| 
|-
| Loss
| align=center| 1–2
| Ken Jackson
| Submission (rear-naked choke)
| Arkansas MMA: Ultimate Fight Night 6
| 
| align=center| 1
| align=center| 3:07
| Fort Smith, Arkansas, United States
| 
|-
| Loss
| align=center| 1–1
| Dom O'Grady
| Submission (guillotine choke)
| XFO 25: Outdoor War 4
| 
| align=center| 3
| align=center| 4:16
| Island Lake, Illinois, United States
| 
|-
| Win
| align=center| 1–0
| Craig Sjoerdsma
| TKO (submission to punches)
| Ultimate Cage Fighting: Rage in the Cage
| 
| align=center| 1
| align=center| N/A
| New Orleans, United States
|

Bare knuckle boxing record

|-
|Loss
|align=center|1–2
|Billy Wagner	
|TKO (ankle injury)
|BKFC Fight Night: Jackson 2
|
|align=center|1
|align=center|1:59
|Jackson, Mississippi, United States
|
|-
|Loss
|align=center|1–1
|Connor Tierney	
|KO (punch)
|BKFC Fight Night: New York 2
| 
|align=center|5
|align=center|1:31
|Salamanca, New York, United States
|
|-
|Win
|align=center|1–0
|Eric Thompson	
|TKO (punch)
|BKFC Fight Night: Jackson
|
|align=center|1
|align=center|1:39
|Jackson, Mississippi, United States

References

External links

1982 births
Living people
American male professional wrestlers
American male mixed martial artists
Middleweight mixed martial artists
Mixed martial artists utilizing wrestling
Tough Enough contestants
Sportspeople from Vicksburg, Mississippi
Professional wrestlers from Mississippi
United States Army soldiers